Jackson Henrique Gonçalves Pereira (born June 3, 1988), commonly known as Jackson, is a Brazilian footballer. He is known for his physical prowess and utility player abilities.

Career
Jackson made his professional debut for São Paulo against Fluminense in a 1-1 draw at the Maracanã in the Campeonato Brasileiro on October 13, 2007. He was then taken off at half-time and replaced by Fernando. He also made his Copa Sudamericana debut for São Paulo in 0-1 home defeat to Millonarios on October 10, 2007.

On August 13, 2010, FC Dallas of Major League Soccer signed Jackson on loan from Brazilian first division side São Paulo FC. He made his debut for his new club the following day, coming on in the 82nd minute for Brek Shea against D.C. United at RFK Stadium in Washington, D.C. He started in the MLS Cup 2010 loss to Colorado Rapids, playing 34 minutes. Jackson was also named to the MLS Team of Week 15 and 16 in the 2011 MLS season for his play against Portland Timbers and Columbus Crew. Jackson was loaned for one year by FC Dallas to Cruzeiro on January 18, 2012. On April 13, 2012, FC Dallas recalled Jackson from Cruzeiro, cutting short the loan deal due to injuries in the FC Dallas midfield.

On December 9, 2013, Jackson was traded to Toronto FC in exchange for allocation money and a conditional second-round draft pick in the 2015 MLS SuperDraft. Toronto declined Jackson's option at the end of the 2015 season. He was not selected in the 2015 MLS Re-Entry Draft and was released from his MLS contract at the end of the year.

Jackson returned to Brazil and signed with Clube Atlético Itapemirim on March 22, 2016.

On December 16, 2016, it was announced that Jackson had signed with NASL expansion side San Francisco Deltas. He left the club a year later, when his contract expired in December 2017.

Jackson signed with Fresno FC on February 12, 2019.

Honours
Campeonato Paulista Sub-17: 2005
Campeonato Paulista Sub-20: 2006
Taça Belo Horizonte: 2006
Campeonato Brasileiro Sub-20: 2006
Brazilian League: 2007

References

External links
globoesporte.globo.com 
CBF 
saopaulofc.net 
 

1988 births
Living people
People from Franca
Brazilian footballers
Brazilian expatriate footballers
Brazilian expatriate sportspeople in Canada
Brazilian expatriate sportspeople in the United States
Rio Branco Esporte Clube players
São Paulo FC players
FC Dallas players
Toronto FC players
Major League Soccer players
San Francisco Deltas players
North American Soccer League players
Expatriate soccer players in the United States
Expatriate soccer players in Canada
Cruzeiro Esporte Clube players
Uberaba Sport Club players
Mogi Mirim Esporte Clube players
Associação Desportiva São Caetano players
Botafogo Futebol Clube (SP) players
Fresno FC players
USL Championship players
Association football midfielders
Association football defenders
Footballers from São Paulo (state)